Addur is a village in the southern state of Karnataka, India. It is located in the Mangalore taluk of Dakshina Kannada district.

Demographics
 India census, Addur had a population of 5,132 with 2,565 males and 2,567 females.

See also
 Dakshina Kannada
 Districts of Karnataka
 Mangalore

References

External links
 http://Dakshina Kannada.nic.in/

Villages in Dakshina Kannada district
Localities in Mangalore